Warrington is an industrial town in the borough of the same name in Cheshire, England. The town sits on the banks of the River Mersey and until 1974, was part of Lancashire.

The population in 2019 was estimated at 165,456 for the town's urban area, and 210,014 for the wider borough, the latter being more than double that of 1968 when it became a new town. Warrington is the largest town in the ceremonial county of Cheshire. In 2011 the unparished area had a population of 58,871.

Warrington was founded by the Romans at an important crossing place on the River Mersey. A new settlement was established by the Saxon Wærings. By the Middle Ages, Warrington had emerged as a market town at the lowest bridging point of the river. A local tradition of textile and tool production dates from this time.

The expansion and urbanisation of Warrington coincided with the Industrial Revolution, particularly after the Mersey was made navigable in the 18th century. The West Coast Main Line runs north to south through the town, and the Liverpool to Manchester railway (the Cheshire Lines route) west to east. The Manchester Ship Canal cuts through the south of the borough (west to east). The M6, M56 and M62 motorways form a partial box around the town and are all accessible through Warrington.

The modern Borough of Warrington was formed in 1974 with the amalgamation of the former County Borough of Warrington, part of the Golborne Urban District, the Lymm Urban District, part of the Runcorn Rural District, the Warrington Rural District and part of the Whiston Rural District.

Toponymy
The earliest known appearance of the name is ‘’Weringtun’', when before the Norman Conquest it was the head of a hundred. An entry in the Domesday Book in AD 1086 named it as ‘’Wallintun‘’. The root is likely the Old English word waru – meaning "those that care for, watch, guard, protect, or defend.” The suffix -ing is a cognate of inge, an ethnonym for the Ingaevones said variously to mean "of Yngvi," "family, people or followers of" or a genitive plural form of an inhabitant appellation.  The suffix "ton" is from the Old English word tun meaning "fenced area" or "enclosure."

History

Early history
Warrington has been a major crossing point on the River Mersey since ancient times and there was a Roman settlement at Wilderspool. Local archaeological evidence indicates that there were also Bronze Age settlements. In medieval times Warrington's importance was as a market town and bridging point of the River Mersey. The first reference to a bridge at Warrington is found in 1285. The origin of the modern town was located in the area around St Elphin's Church, now included in the Church Street Conservation Area, established whilst the main river crossing was via a ford approximately 1 km upriver of Warrington Bridge. Warrington was the first paved town in Lancashire, which took place in 1321.

English Civil War
Warrington was a fulcrum in the English Civil War. The armies of Oliver Cromwell and the Earl of Derby both stayed near the old town centre (the parish church area). Popular legend has it that Cromwell lodged near the building which survives on Church Street as the Cottage Restaurant. The Marquis of Granby public house bears a plaque stating that the Earl of Derby 'had his quarters near this site'. Dents in the walls of the parish church are rumoured to have been caused by the cannons from the time of the civil war. On 13 August 1651 Warrington was the scene of the last Royalist victory of the civil war when Scots troops under Charles II and David Leslie, Lord Newark, fought Parliamentarians under John Lambert at the Battle of Warrington Bridge.

Industrial history
The expansion and urbanisation of Warrington largely coincided with the Industrial Revolution, particularly after the Mersey was made navigable in the 18th century. As Britain became industrialised, Warrington embraced the Industrial Revolution becoming a manufacturing town and a centre of steel (particularly wire), textiles, brewing, tanning and chemical industries. The navigational properties of the River Mersey were improved, canals were built, and the town grew yet more prosperous and popular. When the age of steam came, Warrington naturally welcomed it, both as a means of transport and as a source of power for its mills.

Second World War
Warrington was the location of the Burtonwood RAF base and Risley Ordnance Factory. During World War II, RAF Burtonwood served as the largest US Army Air Force airfield outside the United States, and was visited by major American celebrities including Humphrey Bogart and Bob Hope who entertained the GIs.  The RAF station continued to be used by the USAAF and subsequently USAF as a staging post for men and material until its closure in 1993.

Post-war expansion
Warrington was designated a new town in 1968 and consequently the population grew in size, with many of the town's new residents moving from Liverpool or Manchester, with the Birchwood area being developed on the former ROF Risley site. New council housing was built for families rehousing from slum clearances in Liverpool or Manchester, while Warrington's new private housing estates also became popular with homeowners.

Heavy industry declined in the 1970s and 1980s but the growth of the new town led to a great increase in employment in light industry, retail, distribution and technology.

IRA bombing

On 20 March 1993, the Provisional Irish Republican Army (IRA) detonated two bombs in Warrington town centre. The blasts killed two children: three-year-old Johnathan Ball died instantly, and twelve-year-old Tim Parry, from the Great Sankey area, died five days later in hospital.  Around 56 other people were injured, four seriously.  Their deaths provoked widespread condemnation of the organisation responsible.  The blast followed a bomb attack a few weeks earlier on a gas-storage plant in Warrington.

Tim Parry's father, Colin Parry, founded The Tim Parry Johnathan Ball Foundation for Peace (known as the Peace Centre) as part of a campaign to reconcile communities in conflict. The centre opened on the seventh anniversary of the bombing, 20 March 2000.  He and his family still live in the town.

Other history
In 1981, Warrington was the first place to field a candidate for the new Social Democratic Party: former Home Secretary Roy Jenkins stood for Parliament but lost to Labour Party candidate Doug Hoyle by a small number of votes.

There was a RAF training camp at Padgate, a Royal Naval air base at Appleton Thorn (RNAS Stretton) and an army base at the Peninsula Barracks in O'Leary Street. The Territorial Army was based at the Bath Street drill hall until they moved to Peninsula Barracks.

In October 1987, Swedish home products retailer IKEA opened its first British store in the Burtonwood area of the town, bringing more than 200 retail jobs to the area.

Governance

History

Within the boundaries of the historic county of Lancashire, the town of Warrington was incorporated as a municipal borough in 1847 under the Municipal Corporations Act 1835. The town had its own police force from 1847 to 1969.  Warrington acquired county borough status upon reaching a population of 50,000 in 1900 and until 1974 was known as the County Borough of Warrington.  As part of proposed local government reforms of England, in 1969 the Redcliffe-Maud Report suggested merging Warrington with either Merseyside or Greater Manchester metropolitan counties. Lobbying by the borough council averted this. But, since these county boundary changes were to make Warrington non-contiguous with Lancashire, under the local government reforms of 1974, Warrington, incorporating Lymm Urban District and part of Runcorn Rural District from Cheshire, and part of Warrington Rural District, was made a borough within Cheshire County Council.

On 1 April 1998, Warrington became an independent unitary authority, though it is still served by Cheshire Police and Cheshire Fire and Rescue Service, and forms part of Cheshire for ceremonial purposes, such as the Lord Lieutenancy. Warrington has applied unsuccessfully for city status, the most recent attempt being after the opening of the Peace Centre as a "City for Peace".

Warrington Borough Council
The current borders of Warrington Borough cover the former County Borough of Warrington, Lymm Urban District, Warrington Rural District and part of Golborne Urban District, part of Runcorn Rural District and part of Whiston Rural District.

After the May 2021 election the political makeup of the borough council was as follows: 36 Labour councillors, 11 Conservatives 8 Liberal Democrats, 3 Independents. A Conservative councillor switched to Labour in 2022.

3 Liberal Democrat wards: Grappenhall; Lymm North and Thelwall; Stockton Heath
12 Labour wards: Bewsey & Whitecross; Burtonwood & Winwick; Fairfield & Howley; Great Sankey North; Great Sankey South; Latchford East; Latchford West; Orford; Poplars & Hulme; Poulton North; Poulton South; and Westbrook
2 Conservative wards: Appleton; Culcheth, Glazebury & Croft
4 "split" wards: Birchwood (2 Labour, 1 Conservative); Chapelford & Old Hall (2 Labour, 1 Conservative); Lymm South (1 Conservative, 1 Liberal Democrat); Rixton & Woolston (2 Labour, 1 Conservative); 
1 independent ward: Penketh & Cuerdley

Parish councils
The Borough of Warrington contains 18 parish councils as well as a central unparished area (see list of civil parishes below).

National representation
At Westminster, Warrington is represented by two MPs: Charlotte Nichols (Labour) represents Warrington North, and Andy Carter (Conservative) represents Warrington South.

Geography
The Borough of Warrington is bordered by Halton, Cheshire West and Chester, and Cheshire East boroughs in the ceremonial county of Cheshire and by the metropolitan boroughs of Trafford, Salford and Wigan in Greater Manchester and St. Helens in Merseyside.

Subdivisions, suburbs and civil parishes of Warrington
The Borough of Warrington has 18 civil parishes. The town centre and the area around it are an unparished area.

Civil parishes
Appleton, Birchwood, Burtonwood and Westbrook, Croft, Cuerdley, Culcheth and Glazebury, Grappenhall and Thelwall, Great Sankey, Hatton, Lymm, Penketh,
Poulton-with-Fearnhead (includes Padgate), Rixton-with-Glazebrook, Stockton Heath, Stretton,
Walton, Winwick, Woolston (includes Martinscroft and Paddington)

Other areas, including localities within civil parishes
Appleton Thorn, Bewsey, Blackbrook, Bruche, Callands, Chapelford, Cinnamon Brow, Cobbs, Dallam, Fairfield, Gemini, Gorse Covert, Grange, Hermitage Green, Hollins Green, Hood Manor, Howley, Hulme, Kenyon, Latchford, Locking Stumps, Old Hall, Omega, Longford, Orford, Risley, Sankey Bridges, Westbrook, Westy, Whitecross, Wilderspool, Wright's Green

Climate
Warrington has a temperate maritime climate with warm summers and cool winters. Rain is spread across the year, with thunderstorms only usually occurring in the summer months. Summer heat waves are rare but can cause temperatures to exceed 30 °C. Summers are usually snow free and rarely experience high winds. Winters are generally cold, with most days around 0 °C . Moreover, during occasional lengthy cold snaps, night-time temperatures have been known to fall to −12 °C with lying snow lasting for weeks. Ground frost regularly occurs from late October until late March. High winds are common in winter, although rarely above gale force 7.

Green belt

Warrington is within a green belt region that extends into the wider surrounding counties, and is in place to reduce urban sprawl, prevent the towns in the nearby Manchester and Merseyside conurbations from further convergence, protect the identity of outlying communities, encourage brownfield reuse, and preserve nearby countryside. This is achieved by restricting inappropriate development within the designated areas, and imposing stricter conditions on permitted building.

The main urban area and larger villages of the borough are exempt from the green belt area, but surrounding smaller villages, hamlets and rural areas such as Rixton, Glazebrook, Higher Walton, Kenyon, Stretton, Hatton, Broomedge are 'washed over' with the designation.

A subsidiary aim of the green belt is to encourage recreation and leisure interests, with rural landscape features and facilities including Walton Hall gardens with zoo and bicycle museum, St Oswald's Church and well, the River Mersey with valley and trail, River Bollin, Manchester Ship Canal, Bridgewater Canal, Appleton Reservoir, numerous playing fields, parks and golf clubs, Cuerdley and Norton marshes, the Trans Pennine Trail, the Mersey Forest project, and Sow Brook.

Demography
Based on ONS statistics

Population and ethnicity

At the 2011 census, Warrington had a total population of 202,200, of which 49.6% are male and 50.4% are female. The average age of the population is 38.06 years, which is slightly below the regional and national averages. In 2018 it was estimated that the current population of Warrington is 209,500.

In addition to English, a further 36 languages were recorded spoken by more than 0.01% of Warrington's population aged 3 and over in the 2011 census. Those spoken by more than 0.1% were Polish (0.88%), Slovak (0.21%), Urdu (0.14%), Latvian (0.12%) Non Mandarin or Cantonese Chinese (0.12%) and Tagalog/Filipino (0.11%).

There are around 100 churches or other Christian communities, two mosques, and a Sikh temple Guru Nanak Gurdwara which is the only Sikh place of worship in Cheshire.

The most multicultural parts of Warrington are in the town centre, as well as the western and north western suburbs, such as Bewsey and Westbrook. In 2011, the town was 92.9% White British, 2.3% other White, 2.4% Asian and 0.3% Black.

Housing and social situation
At the 2011 census, the borough of Warrington had 85,100 households. From 2001 data (80,593 households), 76% were owner occupied, 17.6% were rented from the council, 4.8% were rented from other sources and 1.6% of houses had residents who lived rent free. Warrington has a population density of 10.7 residents per hectare, and 31.9% of residents describe the borough as a comfortably well-off area. 4.3% of households are deemed overcrowded. Of the total population, 5.8% of residents are on some form of benefits.

Employment and education
At 2005, the borough of Warrington had 63.6% employment, with only 2.9% of all economically active people unemployed – although a substantial rise began in 2008 due to the recession. 2.3% of the population are students in full-time higher education. 31.1% of the total population are economically inactive (due to retirement, ill health, or full-time carer status). According to borough statistics, of the population (in the Borough of Warrington in 2005). 26.9% are unqualified (either due to leaving school early or failing the end of school examinations). 46.4% have level 1 or 2 qualifications (level 1 being 1+ GCSE (A*-G) or "O" Level or equivalent, level 2 being 5+ GCSEs (grades A-C), 1+'A' levels/ AS levels (A-E) or equivalent). 19.7% have received level 3+ qualifications (meaning 2+ A-levels (A-E), 4+ AS-levels (A-E) or equivalent minimum).

Economy

This is a chart of trend of regional gross value added of Halton and Warrington at current basic prices.

There is a large Unilever factory in Warrington where powder detergents are made. In January 2020, Unilever put the plant under review owing to a fall in demand for washing powder compared with other forms of detergent.

Warrington Council and Warrington & Halton Hospitals NHS Foundation Trust are major employers in the borough.

ESR Technology's main operations are located at Warrington.

Retail

In spite of its proximity to significant retail areas in Manchester, Liverpool, Chester and the out-of-town Trafford Centre, Warrington continues to have one of the larger shopping centres in North West England. Despite the competition, Warrington has seen an increase in its customer trade, due in part to the modernisation of the town centre. It has a shopping centre (Golden Square) first opened in 1974, which has been extended to include a Primark store, and a new bus station. 

The old Cockhedge Textile Mill was demolished and replaced by another shopping mall. The main shopping streets are Buttermarket Street, Horsemarket Street, Sankey Street and Bridge Street. Where these four streets intersect at Market Gate, there is a redevelopment with a large fountain and "guardians" (known locally as "the skittles") designed by Howard Ben Tré. Musical instrument retailer Dawsons Music originates in the town, and was located on Sankey Street from 1898 until 2019. The town also has a large indoor market which was redeveloped as part of the Time Square development which brought the return of a cinema in the town centre along with office space, restaurants, bars and retail opportunities. 

The town also has several other small shopping malls located in the town centre and throughout the town such as Hatters Row and Birchwood Mall. IKEA chose Warrington as the location for their first store when they came to the UK; the store is located in the large out-of-town shopping area of Gemini, which is home to one of the largest Marks and Spencer stores in the UK. Nearby to this, there is also an ODEON Luxe cinema, which was refurbished in 2019.

Leisure
There is ten-pin bowling located in the town centre and at Winwick Quay, and indoor paintball. An indoor karting centre is located near to Bank Quay. Pitch and putt and crazy golf are available at Walton Hall and Gardens. A Laser Quest arena and a snooker club can also be found in Warrington, both located close to the town centre. Gulliver's World theme park is located in Old Hall, Apple Jack's Farm theme park is situated in Stretton.

Developments
The Omega Development Site close to the M62 on the northern edge of Warrington, on part of the site of the Burtonwood Airbase, was intended to be a major business park but has instead been developed as mainly warehousing with a large residential area.

Other planned developments in Warrington were delayed by the economic climate, but redevelopment of the Time Square area, including a new Market, multi-story car park with around 1,200 spaces, cinema, retail outlets and council offices was completed in 2020 with an estimated cost of £142 million.

Warrington is developing a new Local Plan but plans to build 24,000 new homes were scaled back as government guidance changed. Included in the plans would be a new "Garden City Suburb" in the south of Warrington. The four main areas of growth as outlined in the planning were the waterfront around the River Mersey, the town centre, the Garden City Suburb and south west urban extension.

Transport

The town has two main railway stations: Bank Quay is on the West Coast Main Line between London Euston and Glasgow Central and the Manchester Piccadilly to North Wales via Chester line, while Central is on the Liverpool to Manchester line (via Widnes and Warrington) with through services to Sheffield then to East Anglia or Cleethorpes. Bank Quay is much altered, but Central (built 1873) is of some architectural merit, featuring polychromatic brickwork. Both have undergone some refurbishment including new entrances. There are also railway stations in the suburbs at Padgate, Sankey, Glazebrook and Birchwood. A new railway station, Warrington West in Chapelford, near Great Sankey, opened in December 2019.

The town lies close to the M62, M6 and M56 motorways and midway between Liverpool and Manchester airports. It also has five primary A roads, the A49, A50, A56, A57 and A580 (East Lancashire Road), which forms part of the northern boundary of the borough.

Warrington's Own Buses, one of the few municipal bus companies to survive in public ownership, runs most bus services within the town. Go North West and Arriva North West provide bus links to surrounding destinations such as Manchester, the Trafford Centre, Liverpool, St Helens, Runcorn, Widnes and Chester. A real-time passenger information system is installed at some bus stops. A new bus station known as Warrington Interchange opened in 2006 at the Golden Square Shopping Centre.

The River Mersey runs through the heart of the town dividing it in two. There are only two main thoroughfares crossing the Mersey in Warrington: at Warrington Bridge at Bridge Foot and at the Kingsway Bridge. Before the M6 was built, these routes were very busy with through traffic.

The Manchester Ship Canal runs through the south of the town; three swing bridges and a high-level cantilever bridge provide crossing points. Although shipping movements on the ship canal are far less frequent than in years past, they can cause severe delay to local road traffic. The Bridgewater Canal runs through the borough from the village of Lymm to Walton Hall and Gardens, a local park/leisure area. The course of the Sankey Canal runs through the west of the town, although the only navigable section is at the lock to the River Mersey estuary at Fiddlers Ferry.

Warrington Bus Interchange

The interchange consists of 19 departure stands, numbered from 1 to 19, all of which employ a drive-in reverse-out layout. Each stand has a computerised information screen which also ties into the real-time information system. All stands are served from the main concourse building, which contains toilets, a newsagent, cafe, and a combined travel and tourist information office. There is access to the Golden Square shopping centre via escalators and lifts. The exits on the eastern side of the building lead onto Winwick Street, on which can be found a taxi rank and Warrington Central railway station within around 100 metres.

The bus station is the terminus for all local bus services within Warrington. Regional services operate to neighbouring cities Liverpool, Manchester and Chester, as well as to Wigan, Leigh, the Trafford Centre, Altrincham, Northwich, Runcorn, Widnes and St Helens. The majority of bus services are operated by Warrington's Own Buses. Other services are provided by Arriva North West and Go North West.

History 
Warrington Bus Interchange (also known as Warrington Interchange) opened on 21 August 2006, next to the site of a temporary terminus that had been in use for the past thirteen months. The new interchange was built in conjunction with the extension and upgrade of the adjoining Golden Square shopping centre, and replaced the previous bus station which dated from 1979.

In 2021, a 3.5 metre artwork was painted on glass at the bus station.

Culture
In March 2017 Warrington Borough Council made an unsuccessful bid to become the UK City of Culture in 2021. However, various aspects of the town's cultural heritage gained prominence as a result of the bid such as the Grade II-listed Warrington Transporter Bridge, the last railway transporter bridge in the world, and the Warrington Academy which once earned the town the nickname of the Athens of the North.

Warrington has a concert hall (the Parr Hall), an arts centre (the Pyramid), three museums, and various public libraries throughout the borough. Warrington Central Library was the first rate-supported library in the UK.

There is a cinema at Westbrook, and another opened in 2019 as part of a town centre redevelopment. There are several parks in Warrington and designated nature reserves at Woolston Eyes, Risley Moss, Rixton Claypits and Paddington Meadows.

Museums
Warrington Museum & Art Gallery is situated in Warrington's Cultural Quarter on the first floor of a building it currently shares with Warrington Central Library. The town is also home to the Museum of Policing in Cheshire, located in part of the working police station, and the Warrington Museum of Freemasonry.

A heritage centre for the village of Lymm was given planning permission in February 2016.

Events
A number of festivals, carnivals and walking days are held annually in the Warrington area. Warrington Walking Day – originally a Sunday school festival – is held on the closest Friday to the last day of June, and the town centre is closed to traffic as churches walk together through the streets.

Other festivals, besides the many walking days, include:

Appleton Thorn Bawming of the Thorn
Birchwood Carnival and Safari Day
Croft Carnival
Culcheth Community Day
Glazebury Gala
Howley Carnival
Lymm May Queen
Lymm Dickensian Festival
Lymm Rushbearing
Penketh Carnival
Stockton Heath Arts Festival
Thelwall Rose Queen
Warrington Music Festival
Winwick Carnival
Westy Carnival

Music
A regular series of free classical music concerts take place in Bold Street Methodist Church, organised by WACIDOM. This charity is also responsible for the biennial Warrington Competition for Young Musicians, held at Arley Hall. Regular classical recitals also take place at Walton Hall and St Wilfrid's Church, Grappenhall. Warrington also has many musical groups, including Warrington Male Voice Choir, Gemini Musical Theatre Company (formerly Warrington Light Opera), Warrington Youth Orchestra, North Cheshire Wind Orchestra, Centenary Theatre Company and ladies a cappella choir, the Cheshire Chord Company.

Warrington has a purpose-built concert hall, the Parr Hall, which houses a large and internationally famous concert pipe-organ made by the nineteenth-century French organ-builder Aristide Cavaillé-Coll.

A number of rock and pop musicians are associated with Warrington. Madchester pioneers The Stone Roses are closely associated with the town, particularly the native lead singer Ian Brown. Other artists include Spike Dawbarn from 1990s music act band 911, Kerry Katona of Atomic Kitten, Ben Byrne and James Stelfox from Starsailor and Tim Bowness of No-Man. The band Viola Beach (whose single "Swings & Waterslides" posthumously entered the UK Singles Chart at number 11) were formed in Warrington.

The Hit Man and Her TV show featuring producer Pete Waterman (of Stock Aitken Waterman) and Michaela Strachan debuted and regularly returned to the Mr Smiths nightclub in Warrington.

Warrington is home to the Neighbourhood Weekender music festival which takes place on Victoria Park during the May bank holiday weekend. The event was first launched in 2018, over 50,000 attending the event over the two days. The event was repeated in 2019 and was scheduled to return in 2020. The event was also held in 2021.

Open spaces 
Warrington has an array of open spaces, including parks, trails, nature reserves and gardens rich in history and visual beauty. Many of these attractions are dog friendly, and free of charge to enter, usually with man-made paths created to ensure safety. The attractions include:

 Culcheth Linear park- open 24hrs, with public toilets, parking, and staff based around the park
 Lymm dam - open 24hrs, water features, wildlife and woodland walks. Also has angling opportunities and links to the Trans Pennine trail.
 New Cut heritage and ecology trail- ongoing project including linear footpaths, Paddington meadows nature reserve, and links to several other parks in the area (listed below) 
 Risley Moss local nature reserve - works with schools and partakes in regular subjects to help aid the life of local wildlife. Includes car parking and toilets
 Sankey valley park - open 24hrs, includes picnic benches, car parking, angling opportunities and play areas. 
 Trans Pennine Trail - open 24hrs, suitable for cycling, walking and running. Links to many other paths in the area.
 Victoria park - includes sports facilities, changing facilities, training pitches, ASICS Stadium, play area and home to the annual Neighbourhood Weekender music festival 
 Walton gardens - includes gardens, Walton hall, petting zoo, play areas, mini golf and footpaths accessible to all.

Warrington is also home to other small parks and open spaces such Woolston park, Birchwood forest park and Bank park. Most open areas are dog friendly and only require unfriendly dogs to be kept under proper control by owners.

Heritage

The historic core of Warrington contains many significant listed buildings, including Warrington Town Hall, St Elphin's Church and Warrington Museum, situated within Conservation Areas.

Education

Higher education
The University of Chester has a campus at Padgate that was formerly part of Warrington Collegiate.

Colleges
Warrington is home to three colleges: Priestley Sixth Form and Community College, Warrington and Vale Royal College and University Technical College Warrington. Most of the high schools have their own post-16 provision (sixth-form).

Schools

There are 14 high schools throughout the borough:

Woolston High School closed in 2012.

There are also 69 primary schools in the borough.

The Manchester Japanese School (マンチェスター日本人補習授業校 Manchesutā Nihonjin Hoshū Jugyō Kō), a weekend Japanese educational programme, is held at the Language Centre at Lymm High School.

Sport

Rugby league is the town's premier sport in the form of Warrington Wolves, who were historically nicknamed "The Wire" because of Warrington's history of wire making. In 2003 the club left Wilderspool Stadium, its home for over a century, and moved to the Halliwell Jones Stadium. Warrington RLFC are the only team to have played every season in the top flight of rugby league. They established themselves as one of the leading rugby clubs in the country by taking home the Challenge Cup for two years running in 2009 and 2010 and a further win in 2012. This was won by them for the first time since 1974. 

The club also reached the cup finals in 2016 and 2018, where they lost to Hull FC & Catalans Dragons respectively. In 2019, Warrington triumphed over St Helens in the Challenge Cup Final, 18-4, to lift the trophy for the 7th time. In 2011 the Wolves gained the Super League Leaders Shield for the first time (winning again in 2016), and in 2012 they appeared in the Super League Grand Final for the first time versus Leeds Rhinos with the chance to become only the third team to win the Challenge Cup/Grand Final double – however, they lost. They also reached the Grand Final again in 2013, 2016 and 2018, losing to Wigan Warriors on all occasions, Warrington's last domestic title came in 1955, when they beat Oldham at Manchester City's Maine Road. Warrington is represented in the British Amateur Rugby League Association leagues by: 
 Bank Quay Bulls ARLFC
 Burtonwood Bulldogs ARLFC
 Crosfields ARLFC
 Culcheth Eagles ARLFC
 Latchford Albion ARLFC
 Rylands ARFLC
 Woolston Rovers ARLFC

Football is represented by Warrington Town at Cantilever Park, next to the Manchester Ship Canal. The club has several nicknames including Town, Yellows and The Wire. Warrington Town are currently in the Northern Premier League Premier Division following promotion in 2016. Warrington's biggest success was in the 2014 FA Cup where they reached the first round proper for the first time, whilst in the eighth tier. Warrington drew Exeter City of the fourth tier, who were at the time of the game 100 places above the Yellows. The match was shown live on BBC One and sold out Cantilever Park. Warrington famously won the game 1–0, but lost to 5th-tier Gateshead in the second round.

Rowing in Warrington may well have been taking place for nearly 200 years. It is known that Warrington Regatta is well over 150 years old, often attracting large crowds on the riverbank.
The modern Warrington rowing club started in the mid-1980s and is based near Kingsway Bridge. Warrington is home to both recreational and competitive rowers.

Warrington Athletic Club is based at Victoria Park, where a new eight-lane synthetic track was built in 1998, after the original track was destroyed in a fire the previous year.

Speedway racing, formerly known as dirt track racing, was staged in Warrington in its pioneering era between 1928 and 1930. The track entered a team in the 1929 English Dirt Track League and the 1930 Northern League. Efforts to revive the venue in 1947 failed to materialise.

Warrington Wolves Basketball team was set up in 2009 and competes in the English Basketball League Division Four.

Warrington has four predominant rugby union teams: Warrington RUFC, Lymm RFC, Gentlemen of Moore RUFC and Eagle RUFC, who are based at Thornton Road.

Media
Warrington's longest established newspaper is the Warrington Guardian. Published weekly and costing £1, it is currently owned by Newsquest and has sales of just over 17,000. Bridge Foot based Orbit News Ltd produce a monthly free news magazine, Warrington Worldwide, as well as three community magazines, Warrington Worldwide, Lymm Life (first published April 1999) and Culcheth Life (First published April 2003) and the daily news website. The free monthly newspaper Cheshire Times is also distributed in the southern half of the borough.

Community radio station Radio Warrington broadcasts from a studio in Warrington Retail Market. They hold an AM licence and have received planning permission for a transmitter, though their broadcasts are currently only available online.  Independent Local Radio station Greatest Hits Radio Liverpool & The North West (formerly Wire FM), now based in Orrell, also serves the Warrington area.

Landmarks
See also Listed buildings in Warrington

Churches and other religious buildings

St Wilfrid's Church, Grappenhall, Grade I listed medieval church
St Oswald's Church, Winwick, Grade I listed medieval church
The 14th-century Parish Church of St Elphin, largely a Victorian rebuild with a  spire, the sixth tallest in the UK
Holy Trinity Church, 1758, Grade II* listed Georgian church at Market Gate
St Mary's Church, Grade II church designed by E.W. Pugin and Peter Paul Pugin in Buttermarket Street

Civic amenities
Warrington Museum & Art Gallery, Grade II listed building and one of the oldest municipal museums in the UK
Warrington Town Hall (and its golden gates), formerly Bank Hall (built 1750), the home of the Philips family and their scion the artist Nathaniel George Philips
Halliwell Jones Stadium, home of Warrington Wolves
Parr Hall Concert Hall, home to a rare concert pipe-organ made by the great French organ-builder Aristide Cavaillé-Coll
Pyramid Arts Centre on Palmyra Square

Industrial and commercial structures
Warrington Transporter Bridge, a Grade II* listed building and a Scheduled Ancient Monument
The Barley Mow, established in 1561, the oldest pub in Warrington
The Cheshire Lines railway warehouse, now redeveloped as apartments
The row of late Victorian terracotta-clad shops on Bridge Street
Fiddlers Ferry Power Station, now being decommissioned
The industrial modernist Unilever Soapworks
IKEA store, near the Gemini retail park, the first of the IKEA chain to be built in the UK
The former Woolworth's Building in Sankey Street (originally Garnett's furniture showroom and currently Poundland) 
Musical instrument retailer Dawsons Music has been based on Sankey Street since 1898, where its headquarters remain to this day.

Other
Grappenhall Heys Walled Garden
The Warrington Academy, a dissenters' institute where Joseph Priestley once taught. After the academy moved, the building housed the offices of the local newspaper the Warrington Guardian until June 2016. A Grade II listed statue of Oliver Cromwell stands in front of the Academy.
"Cromwell's Cottage" (17th century), which Oliver Cromwell is said to have visited

Notable residents

Up to 1700
James Bell (1524–1584), Catholic priest and martyr, born in Warrington
Thomas Dallam (c1570 – 1614), organ builder and Elizabethan trade envoy to Constantinople. His family came from Dallam.
Edward Barlow (1639 in Warrington – 1719), priest and mechanician
John Harrison (1693–1776), inventor of the marine chronometer which established longitude; long-time inhabitant of Warrington
Susanna Wright (1697 in Warrington – 1784), colonial American poet and pundit, botanist, business owner and legal scholar
Hamlet Winstanley (1698–1756), painter and engraver; designer of Stanley Street in Warrington town centre. Born in Warrington and lived there in his later years before dying there.

1700 to 1800
John Macgowan (1726–1780), non-conformist preacher and satirist; resident of Warrington
Anna Blackburne (1726–1793), naturalist and correspondent of Carl Linnaeus; lived and died in Warrington 
Edward Evanson (1731 in Warrington – 1805), controversial clergyman
Joseph Priestley FRS, (1733–1804), non-conformist clergyman, philosopher and scientist, discoverer of oxygen; lived in Warrington and taught at the Warrington Academy between 1761 and 1767
Thomas Percival FRS FRSE FSA (1740 in Warrington − 1804), physician and author, crafted the first modern code of medical ethics
Anna Laetitia Barbauld (1743–1825), poet and literary critic; lived in Warrington 1758–1774
Peter Litherland (1756–1805), watchmaker and inventor of the lever watch; born in Warrington
Elizabeth Whitlock (1761 in Warrington – 1836), actress, a member of the Kemble family of actors
Colonel John Drinkwater Bethune (1762 in Latchford – 1844), army officer, administrator and military historian, documented the Great Siege of Gibraltar 
John Cragg (1767 in Warrington–1854), English ironmaster who ran a foundry in Liverpool
Arthur Aikin FLS, FGS (1773 in Warrington – 1854), chemist, mineralogist and scientific writer, and was a founding member of the Chemical Society
Charles Rochemont Aikin (1775 in Warrington – 1847), doctor and chemist
Edmund Aikin (1780 in Warrington – 1820), architect and writer on architecture
Lucy Aikin (1781 in Warrington – 1864), historical writer, also published under the pseudonym Mary Godolphin.
Maria Hill (1791 in Winwick–1881), Canadian heroine of the War of 1812
Joseph Crosfield (1792–1844), businessman, established a soap and chemical manufacturing business in Warrington called Joseph Crosfield and Sons
William Beamont (1797–1889), Victorian solicitor and local philanthropist, founded several churches and the municipal library
William Wilson (1799 in Warrington–1871), botanist, known for his focus on bryology

1800 to 1900
William John Beamont (1828 in Warrington – 1868), clergyman and author
Philip Pearsall Carpenter, Presbyterian minister between 1846 and 1862
James Charles (1851 in Warrington – 1906), impressionist artist
Reginald Essenhigh (1890 in Warrington–1955), MP for Newton from 1931 to 1935 and then a judge
Sir Luke Fildes (1843–1927), artist, studied at Warrington School of Art
Sir Gilbert Greenall, 1st Baronet DL (1806–1894), businessman and Conservative MP for Warrington 1847–1868, 1874–1880 and 1885–1892
William Kirtley (1840 in Warrington – 1919), Locomotive Superintendent of the London Chatham and Dover Railway
Joseph Leicester (1825 in Warrington – 1903), glass blower and Liberal politician, MP for West Ham South from 1885 to 1886
Jeannie Mole (1841 in Warrington – 1912), socialist, feminist, and trade union organiser
William Norman, VC (1832–1896), local war hero, born in Warrington
William Owen (1846 in Latchford – 1910), architect who practised in Warrington, collaborated with William Lever in the creation of Port Sunlight
B. H. Roberts (1857 in Warrington – 1933), Mormon leader, historian, politician and polygamist
Peter Rylands (1820 in Warrington – 1887), wire manufacturer and Liberal politician who was an MP in two periods between 1868 and 1887
Captain Guy Wareing DFC (1899 in Latchford – 1918), World War I flying ace
John Webster (1845 in Warrington – 1914), civil engineer who specialised in designing bridges
Jack Wilson (1894 in Warrington – 1970), partner in Wilson, Keppel and Betty, a popular British music hall and vaudeville act
Henry Woods RA (1846 in Warrington – 1921), painter and illustrator, an artist of the Neo-Venetian school

1900 to 1950
George Formby (1904–1961), entertainer, lived for many years in Warrington and is buried in Warrington Cemetery, with his father George Formby Sr, also an entertainer
 Ernest Whitty (1907–1985), footballer who played Association football for Burnley, Darwen and Chorley in the 1930s.
George Cardell Briggs (1910 in Warrington–2004), the first Bishop of The Seychelles
Petty Officer Alfred Edward Sephton VC (1911 in Warrington – 1941), recipient of the Victoria Cross
Reginald Waywell (1924-2019), artist, lived in Warrington
Burt Kwouk OBE (1930–2016), actor, The Pink Panther films, born in Warrington
Eric Tucker (1932–2018), artist
Geoffrey Hewitt (1934–2019) FREng, FRS, British chemical engineer notable for contributions to heat transfer and multiphase flow, in 2007 recipient of Global Energy Prize
Dave Cook (1941 in Warrington–1993), British communist activist, also known as a rock climber
Ossie Clark (1942–1996), fashion designer, raised in Warrington, attended William Beamont Secondary Technical School
Sue Johnston (born 1943), actress, Brookside and The Royle Family
Ann Pilling (born 1944 in Warrington), author and poet best known for young adult fiction
Pete Postlethwaite (1946–2011), actor, born in Warrington; a studio in the Pyramid Arts Centre has been named after him
Peter Brimelow (born 1947 in Warrington), American writer, Paleoconservative
Paul Lewis (born 1948 in Warrington), freelance financial journalist and broadcaster, presenter of Money Box on BBC Radio 4
David Banks (born 1948 in Warrington), former British newspaper editor

1950 to date
Pete McCarthy (1951–2004), actor, born in Warrington, honoured in a plaque on the wall of the Pyramid Arts Centre
Steve Parker (born 1952 in Warrington), writer of children's and adult's science books
Martin Sixsmith (born 1954 in Warrington), author and radio/television presenter, primarily working for the BBC
Joan Ryan (born 1955 in Warrington), politician, MP for Enfield North 1997–2010 and 2015–2019
Philippa Perry (born 1957 in Warrington), psychotherapist, supporter of the Women's Equality Party and married to artist and cross-dresser Grayson Perry 
George Davey Smith (born 1959 in Warrington), epidemiologist
Garry Newlove (1959–2007), victim of high-profile murder in August 2007, attacked outside his house in Fearnhead
Antony Green AO (born 1960 in Warrington), Australian psephologist and commentator
Helen Newlove, Baroness Newlove (born 1961), Warrington-based community reform campaigner, appointed Victims' Commissioner in 2012
Gary Slater (born 1961 in Warrington), sports journalist, currently working for the Daily Telegraph
Martin Roberts (born 1963), presenter of BBC 1's Homes Under the Hammer 
Robin Jarvis (born 1963), brought up in Warrington, young adult fiction and children's novelist, writes dark fantasy, suspense and supernatural thrillers 
Andy Bird CBE (born c.1964 in Warrington), film producer and executive, chairman of Walt Disney International
Tim Firth (born 1964 in Warrington), dramatist, screenwriter and songwriter
Gavin Patterson (born 1967), brought up in Warrington, chief executive of BT Group plc since 2013
Rebekah Brooks (born 1968), journalist, newspaper editor and former chief executive of News International, attended Appleton Hall County Grammar School in Warrington
Chris Matheson (born 1968 in Warrington), Labour Party politician, MP for the City of Chester since 2015
Liam Byrne (born 1970 in Warrington), Labour Party politician, MP for Birmingham Hodge Hill since 2004
Curtis Jobling (born 1972), author, illustrator, animator and production designer of Bob the Builder, lives in Warrington
Helen Wilson (born 1973 in Warrington), mathematician at University College London, focuses on theoretical and numerical modelling
Steven Arnold (born 1974), actor, known for his role as Ashley Peacock in Coronation Street, born in Warrington
Helen Walsh (born 1977), writer and film director
Warren Brown (born 1978), regular BBC actor, born and lives in Warrington
Nathan Head (born 1980 in Warrington), actor, known for his work in the British horror genre
Darren Jeffries (born 1982), actor, best known for his role as OB in Hollyoaks
George Sampson (born 1993), dancer and winner of Britain's Got Talent in 2008

Music
Edwin 'Ted' Astley (1922–1998), composer, most notably the themes to The Saint and Danger Man
Edna Savage (1936 in Warrington – 2000), traditional pop singer 
Tim Curry (born 1946), actor, singer and composer, born in Warrington and lived in Grappenhall
Pete Waterman OBE (born 1947), record producer, lives in Warrington, in the village of Winwick
John Maines (born 1948 in Warrington), musician, trombone player and active figure in the British brass band movement as a performer, conductor, tutor, compere and concert presenter
Gareth Jones (born 1954 in Warrington), music producer and engineer notable for working with Depeche Mode
Miles Tredinnick, also known as Riff Regan (born Warrington 1955), rock musician, songwriter and a stage and screenwriter
Phil Kelsall MBE (born 1956 in Warrington), principal organist at the Blackpool Tower Ballroom since 1977
Stephen Hough (born 1961), international concert pianist and classical composer, raised in Warrington
Tim Bowness (born 1963), singer-songwriter, singer in the band No-Man, born and brought up in Stockton Heath
Ian Brown (born 1963), lead singer of The Stone Roses, born in Warrington, lived in Forster Street, now lives in Lymm
Chris Evans (born 1966), DJ and TV presenter, born and grew up in Warrington
Anthony Whittaker (born 1968), composer and pianist, born in Warrington
Jan Linton (born c.1968), singer-songwriter, born in Warrington but re-located to Japan
Chris Braide (born 1973), songwriter and record producer,  born and lived in Padgate
Dave Vitty (Comedy Dave) (born 1974), DJ and Dancing on Ice contestant, came from Hong Kong, brought up in Warrington.
Kerry Katona (born 1980), singer/actress, born and grew up in Warrington
Bill Ryder-Jones (born 1983), former guitarist of The Coral, born in Warrington
Viola Beach (formed in 2013), band from Warrington
James Smith (born 1990), lead singer of Yard Act, brought up in Lymm

Sport
Steve Donoghue (1884–1945), jockey, ten times British flat racing Champion Jockey, born in Warrington
George Duckworth (1901–1966), first class cricketer, who played Test cricket for England, was born in Warrington. He played first class cricket for Lancashire between 1923 and 1947.
Fred Worrall (1910 in Warrington– 1979), footballer, made 425 professional appearances
Harold 'Moggy' Palin (1916 in Warrington–1990), professional rugby league footballer
Roger Hunt (born 1938), footballer for Liverpool F.C., member of England's 1966 World Cup squad, born in Glazebury, lives in Warrington, made a Freeman of the Borough on 5 December 2016
Neil McGrath (born 1942), former racing driver
Bob Fulton (1947–2021), Australian Rugby League player and selector, born in Stockton Heath
Keith Elwell (born 1950 in Warrington), professional rugby league footballer, played 591 games for Widnes
Wade Dooley (born 1957), former England rugby union international, played lock forward, played for his country 55 times
Gary Bannister (born 1960 in Warrington), former professional footballer who made 539 pro appearances
Hugh de Prez (1951–2008), cricketer
Neil Fairbrother (born 1963), first class cricketer, played Test cricket for England, born in Warrington
Tony Ward (born 1970), former professional footballer

Alan Hughes (born 1971 in Warrington), prominent crown green bowler

Tony Bullock (born 1972), former professional footballer who played as a goalkeeper, 358 pro appearances
Stephen Foster (born 1980), defender and captain of Barnsley F.C., born in the town
David Wright (born 1980 in Warrington), former professional footballer with 488 pro appearances
Ian Sharps (born 1980 in Warrington), former footballer with 565 pro appearances, now First-Team Coach at Walsall F.C.
Paul Hanagan (born in 1980), twice British champion flat jockey, born in Warrington
Matt Doughty (born 1981 in Warrington), former professional footballer, over 400 pro appearances
Jonathan Akinyemi (born 1988), Olympic Canoe Slalom athlete for team Nigeria, born and lives in Warrington
James Chester (born 1989), footballer currently playing for Hull City A.F.C., born in Warrington
Jesse Lingard, (born 1992), footballer for Manchester United F.C., born in Warrington
Jack Robinson (born 1993 in Warrington), professional footballer, plays for Queens Park Rangers F.C.

Twin towns 
Warrington is twinned with: 
  Hilden, Germany
  Nachod, Czech Republic

The villages of Lymm and Culcheth, within the borough, are twinned respectively with these French communes:
  Meung-sur-Loire, France
  Saint-Leu-la-Foret, France

Freedom of the Borough
The following people and military units have received the Freedom of the Borough of Warrington.

Individuals
 Lord Hoyle, November 2005
 Roger Hunt, December 2016

Military units
 The South Lancashire Regiment, September 1947
 The Queen's Lancashire Regiment, March 1970
 The Duke of Lancaster's Regiment, 2006
 75 Engineer Regiment, 2013

See also

Warrington Dock
Walton Lea Walled Garden
Warrington power station

Notes

References

Further reading
 , illustrated with silhouette likenesses
 .
 .

External links

Warrington Borough Council

 
Cheshire and Warrington Local Enterprise Partnership
New towns in England
New towns started in the 1960s
Populated places established in the 8th century
Towns in Cheshire
Unparished areas in Cheshire